The All-Ireland Senior Hurling Championship of 1998 (known for sponsorship reasons as the Guinness Hurling Championship 1998) was the 112th staging of Ireland's premier hurling  competition.  Offaly won the championship, beating Kilkenny 2–16 to 1–13 in the final at Croke Park, Dublin.

Format
1998 was the second year that the controversial "back door" or qualifier system was used in the All-Ireland Championship.  While the two provincial final winners automatically qualify for the All-Ireland semi-finals the two defeated provincial teams join Galway and the Ulster provincial final winners in two "quarter-finals".  The two winners from these two games qualify for the semi-finals where they meet the Leinster and Munster winners.  In 1998 Waterford and Offaly were the two teams to benefit from the qualifier system.

Semi-final controversy
The All-Ireland semi-final replay between Clare and Offaly ended in controversy when the referee, Jimmy Cooney, mistakenly ended the game five minutes earlier than he had intended.  At the time of the early stoppage, the score was 1–16 to 2–10 in favour of Clare.  When the whistle blew there was disarray in Croke Park as the disgruntled Offaly supporters began a sit-down protest on the pitch. A Kildare v. Kerry IHC game planned for afterwards had to be cancelled.

Clare graciously agreed to have the game replayed.  In the re-fixture in Thurles 6 days later, the result was reversed with Offaly winning the game on a score of 0–16 to 0–13.

All-Ireland final
As a result of the new qualifier system of games for the second year in a row, the All-Ireland final was contested by two teams from the same province. However, this year the final was a repeat of the Leinster final with Offaly taking on Kilkenny. Offaly were playing in their Third All-Ireland Final of the 1990s(having won against Limerick in 1994 and lost to Clare in 1995). Goals for Offaly reversed the Leinster final result and allowed the Offaly men to defeat "the Cats" heavily.

Provincial championships

Connacht Senior Hurling Championship

Leinster Senior Hurling Championship

Munster Senior Hurling Championship

Ulster Senior Hurling Championship

All-Ireland Senior Hurling Championship 
Bracket

Top scorers

Season

Single game

External links
All-Ireland Senior Hurling Championship 1998 Results

All-Ireland Senior Hurling Championship
1998
Hurling controversies